Angelo Gigli (born June 4, 1983) is an Italian professional basketball player who plays for Basket Ferentino of the Italian Serie A2 Basket. He has also represented the Italian national team internationally.

Early life
Gigli was born in South Africa, where his father worked. He moved to Italy when he was two years old.

Professional career
He began his career with Fortitudo Roma. He then played for Reggio Emilia, Pallacanestro Treviso, and Lottomatica Roma. In July 2011 he signed with Virtus Bologna.

On August 5, 2013, Gigli signed a two-year contract with Emporio Armani Milano. In February 2014, he was loaned to Pallacanestro Reggiana for the remainder of the season. In August 2014, he returned to Emporio Armani.

Gigli sign with the Serie A2 club Basket Ferentino on July 29, 2015.

Italian national team
Gigli was a member of the senior men's Italian national basketball team from 2005 to 2012 playing in EuroBasket 2005, 2006 FIBA World Championship and  EuroBasket 2007.

References

External links
 Angelo Gigli at euroleague.net
 Angelo Gigli at legabasket.it 

1983 births
Living people
2006 FIBA World Championship players
Basket Ferentino players
Centers (basketball)
Italian men's basketball players
Italian South African
Lega Basket Serie A players
Olimpia Milano players
Pallacanestro Reggiana players
Pallacanestro Treviso players
Pallacanestro Virtus Roma players
Power forwards (basketball)
South African men's basketball players
South African people of Italian descent
Virtus Bologna players